Anantasak Panyuthapum was a Thai former Muay Thai fighter and boxer. He was the 1997 Muay Thai Fighter of the Year according to the Sports Writers Association of Thailand.

Biography & career
Anantasak Panyuthapum born as Suttisak Samaksaman (สุทธิศักดิ์ สมัครสมาน) in Mueang Surin District (later separated into Tambon Prasat Thong and Khwao Sinarin District), Surin Province, lower northeastern Thailand. He started Muay Thai at the age of 9 in his native province of Surin. He later joined the Panyuthapum gym in Samut Prakan where he received his ring name.

At the peak of his career Panyuthapum had a 180,000 baht purse and was considering one of the most dangerous elbow fighter. Nicknamed the "Flying Axe Elbow" a lot of his opponents finished fights with a bloody face.

In amateur boxing he participated for the first time in the Thailand Championships in Nakhon Sawan at Lightweight (-60 kg) class. In the final, he lost to Somchai Nakbalee, since this experience, he has been competing in the Featherweight (-57 kg) division. He continued to fight until he was selected for the national team, but he was only the substitute for the first Thai Summer Olympics gold medalist Somluck Kamsing. Although being known as a heavy puncher, he had fought with Kamsing twice, losing both due to the agility of Kamsing.

After his fighting career Panyuthapum became a boxing instructor in the Royal Thai Army (RTA).

Titles & honours

Muay Thai
Siam Omnoi Stadium
 1997 Omnoi Stadium 126 lbs Champion (defended once)
 1997 Isuzu Cup Tournament Winner

World Muay Thai Council
 1996 WMTC World 122 lbs Champion

Awards
 1997 Sports Writers Association of Thailand Fighter of the Year

Boxing
Pan Asian Boxing Association
 2005 PABA Super Featherweight Champion

Fight record

|-  style="background:#fbb;"
| 1998-12-23|| Loss ||align=left| Muangfahlek Kiatwichan || Rajadamnern Stadium || Bangkok, Thailand || Decision || 5 || 3:00
|-  style="background:#cfc;"
| 1998-|| Win ||align=left| Neungsiam Kiatwichian|| Channel 7 Stadium || Bangkok, Thailand || Decision || 5 || 3:00
|-  style="background:#fbb;"
| 1998-|| Loss ||align=left| Itthidet Sor.Sukontip || Rajadamnern Stadium || Bangkok, Thailand || Decision || 5 || 3:00
|-  style="background:#cfc;"
| 1998-|| Win ||align=left| Muangfahlek Kiatwichan || Rajadamnern Stadium || Bangkok, Thailand || Decision || 5 || 3:00
|-  style="background:#cfc;"
| 1998-|| Win ||align=left| Donking Kiatpayathai || Omnoi Stadium || Samut Sakhon, Thailand || TKO  || 3 ||
|-  style="background:#cfc;"
| 1998-05-09|| Win ||align=left| Ittidej Sor.Boonya || Omnoi Stadium || Samut Sakhon, Thailand || KO (Left elbow) || 5 ||
|-
! style=background:white colspan=9 |
|-  style="background:#cfc;"
| 1998-|| Win ||align=left| Thanongsak Sit.Or|| Lumpinee Stadium || Bangkok, Thailand || Decision || 5 || 3:00
|-  style="background:#cfc;"
| 1998-03-03|| Win ||align=left| Singsarawat 13CoinsTower || Lumpinee Stadium || Bangkok, Thailand || Decision || 5 || 3:00
|-  style="background:#cfc;"
| 1998-|| Win ||align=left| Neungsiam Kiatwichian|| Lumpinee Stadium || Bangkok, Thailand || Decision || 5 || 3:00
|-  style="background:#cfc;"
| 1997-12-20|| Win ||align=left| Phetnamek Por.Siriwat ||Omnoi Stadium || Samut Sakhon, Thailand || KO (Left Elbow)|| 4 ||

|-  style="background:#cfc;"
| 1997-04-26|| Win ||align=left| Singdam Or.Ukrit || Omnoi Stadium - Isuzu Cup Final || Samut Sakhon, Thailand || Decision || 5 || 3:00
|-
! style=background:white colspan=9 |
|-  style="background:#cfc;"
| 1997-02-01|| Win ||align=left| Changnoi Sirimongkol || Omnoi Stadium - Isuzu Cup Semi Final || Samut Sakhon, Thailand || KO (Left hook) || 4 ||

|-  style="background:#cfc;"
| 1996-12-21|| Win ||align=left| Chutin Por.Tawatchai || Omnoi Stadium - Isuzu Cup || Samut Sakhon, Thailand || Decision || 5 || 3:00
|-  style="background:#cfc;"
| 1996-|| Win ||align=left| Saenklai Sit Kru Od || Omnoi Stadium - Isuzu Cup || Samut Sakhon, Thailand || Decision || 5 || 3:00
|-
! style=background:white colspan=9 |
|-  style="background:#cfc;"
| 1996-|| Win ||align=left| Komkiat Sor.Thanikul || Omnoi Stadium - Isuzu Cup || Samut Sakhon, Thailand || Decision ||5  ||3:00
|-  style="background:#fbb;"
| ? || Loss||align=left| Auttapon Sor Wandee || Lumpinee Stadium || Bangkok, Thailand || Referee Stoppage (Broken foot)||  ||
|-  style="background:#fbb;"
| 1996- || Loss||align=left| Namtaothong Sor.Sirikul ||  || Bangkok, Thailand || Decision || 5 ||3:00

|-  style="background:#cfc;"
| 1996-03-22|| Win ||align=left| Dara-ek Sitrungsap || Lumpinee Stadium || Bangkok, Thailand || KO || 2 ||  
|-
|-  style="background:#cfc;"
| 1995-12-14|| Win ||align=left| Watcharalek Wongwianyaiplaza || Lumpinee Stadium || Bangkok, Thailand || Decision || 5 || 3:00
|-  style="background:#fbb;"
| 1995-10-06|| Loss ||align=left| Chaidet Kiatchansing || Lumpinee Stadium || Bangkok, Thailand || Decision || 5 || 3:00
|-  style="background:#cfc;"
| 1995-09-15|| Win ||align=left| Kacha Manwut || Lumpinee Stadium || Bangkok, Thailand || KO || 3 ||
|-  style="background:#fbb;"
| 1995-08-11|| Loss ||align=left| Watcharalek Wongwianyaiplaza || Lumpinee Stadium || Bangkok, Thailand || KO (High kick)|| 3 ||

|-  style="background:#;"
| 1995-07-14|| ||align=left| Watcharalek WongwianYaiPlaza || Lumpinee Stadium || Bangkok, Thailand || ||  ||

|-  style="background:#cfc;"
| 1995-05-03|| Win ||align=left| Putja Damloksamgym || Rajadamnern Stadium || Bangkok, Thailand || Decision || 5 || 3:00

|-  style="background:#fbb;"
| 1995-03-31|| Loss ||align=left| Muangfahlek Kiatwichan || Lumpinee Stadium || Bangkok, Thailand || Decision || 5 || 3:00

|-  style="background:#cfc;"
| 1995-02-23|| Win ||align=left| Muangfahlek Kiatwichan || Lumpinee Stadium || Bangkok, Thailand || Decision || 5 || 3:00
|-  style="background:#fbb;"
| 1995-01-20|| Loss ||align=left| Saenklai Sit Kru Od || Lumpinee Stadium || Bangkok, Thailand || Decision || 5 || 3:00 
|-
|-  style="background:#cfc;"
| 1994-10-18|| Win ||align=left| Jaowayha Looktubfah || Lumpinee Stadium || Bangkok, Thailand || Decision || 5 || 3:00
|-  style="background:#cfc;"
| 1994-09-16|| Win ||align=left| Jaowayha Looktubfah || Lumpinee Stadium || Bangkok, Thailand || Decision || 5 || 3:00
|-  style="background:#fbb;"
| 1994-07-05|| Loss ||align=left| Dara-ek Sitrungsap || Lumpinee Stadium || Bangkok, Thailand || TKO (Injury/Shin cut)|| 3 ||  
|-
|-  style="background:#cfc;"
| 1994-05-06|| Win ||align=left| Padejsuk Kiatsmaran || Lumpinee Stadium || Bangkok, Thailand || TKO || 2 ||
|-  style="background:#cfc;"
| 1994-04-08|| Win ||align=left| Saichon Ploysakda || Lumpinee Stadium || Bangkok, Thailand || KO (Left uppercut) || 3 ||
|-  style="background:#cfc;"
| 1994-01-21|| Win ||align=left| Thabtimsiam Por.Nittirat  || Lumpinee Stadium || Bangkok, Thailand || Decision || 5 || 3:00 
|-
! style=background:white colspan=9 |
|-  style="background:#fbb;"
| 1993-12-07|| Loss ||align=left| Saenklai Sit Kru Od || Lumpinee Stadium || Bangkok, Thailand || Decision || 5 || 3:00 
|-
! style=background:white colspan=9 |
|-  style="background:#cfc;"
| 1993-11-05|| Win ||align=left| Dokmaipa Por Pongsawang || Lumpinee Stadium || Bangkok, Thailand || KO (Left cross) || 2 ||
|-  style="background:#cfc;"
| 1993-10-15|| Win ||align=left| Singdam Or.Ukrit || Lumpinee Stadium || Bangkok, Thailand || Decision || 5 || 3:00
|-  style="background:#cfc;"
| 1993-09-14|| Win ||align=left| Singdam Or.Ukrit || Lumpinee Stadium || Bangkok, Thailand || TKO (Doctor Stoppage)|| 4 ||
|-  style="background:#cfc;"
| 1993-08-10|| Win ||align=left| Kengkat Kiatkamthorn || Lumpinee Stadium || Bangkok, Thailand || Decision || 5 || 3:00
|-  style="background:#cfc;"
| 1993-07-24|| Win ||align=left| Changnoi Sirimongkol || Lumpinee Stadium || Bangkok, Thailand || Decision || 5 || 3:00
|-  style="background:#cfc;"
| 1993-06-22|| Win ||align=left| Dara-ek Sitrungsap || Lumpinee Stadium || Bangkok, Thailand || Decision || 5 || 3:00
|-  style="background:#fbb;"
| 1993-05-22|| Loss ||align=left| Changnoi Sirimongkol ||Lumpinee Stadium || Bangkok, Thailand || Decision || 5 || 3:00
|-  style="background:#cfc;"
| 1993-04-25|| Win||align=left| Klaikangwan Or Seebualoi|| Lumpinee Stadium || Bangkok, Thailand || Decision || 5 || 3:00
|-  style="background:#fbb;"
| 1993-04-02|| Loss ||align=left| Saenklai Sit Kru Od || Lumpinee Stadium || Bangkok, Thailand || Decision || 5 || 3:00
|-  style="background:#cfc;"
| 1993-03-12|| Win ||align=left| Yodkhunpon Sittraiphum ||Lumpinee Stadium || Bangkok, Thailand || KO || 2 ||
|-  style="background:#cfc;"
| 1993-01-22|| Win ||align=left| Phansak Sor.Boonya || Lumpinee Stadium || Bangkok, Thailand || Decision || 5 || 3:00
|-  style="background:#cfc;"
| 1992-12-15|| Win ||align=left| Thongsabad Biyaphan || Lumpinee Stadium || Bangkok, Thailand || KO || 2 ||
|-  style="background:#fbb;"
| 1992-11-17|| Loss ||align=left| Prakatsuk Kiatmuangtrang || Lumpinee Stadium || Bangkok, Thailand || Decision || 5 || 3:00 
|-
| colspan=9 | Legend:

References

External links

1973 births
Living people
Anantasak Panyuthaphum
Featherweight boxers
Boxing trainers
Anantasak Panyuthaphum
Anantasak Panyuthaphum
Southeast Asian Games medalists in boxing
Anantasak Panyuthaphum